Matt Evers (born March 16, 1976) is an American pair skater, model and actor. He is the 1998 U.S. Junior champion, and has competed in every series of the ITV series Dancing on Ice.

Career
With his partner Heather Allebach, Evers won the Junior pairs title at the 1998 U.S. Championships. The following season, they competed at three senior international events, 1998 Skate Canada International, 1998 Cup of Russia and 1998 Nebelhorn Trophy. He quit competing and moved to Los Angeles where he worked for a number of years before receiving an invitation to join Dancing on Ice.

Results
Pair skating with Allebach:

Dancing on Ice

Filmography

Personal life
Evers, who was married to a woman previously, came out as gay in January 2018 in an interview with Attitude magazine. He said it was partly the death of his uncle from AIDS and the presidency of Donald Trump that resulted in his decision to announce his sexuality publicly, saying: "I live my life by example, and I want to show young people that what you feel or how you were born isn't something bad."

References

External links

1976 births
Living people
American male pair skaters
Gay sportsmen
LGBT figure skaters
American LGBT sportspeople
LGBT people from Minnesota